Yancey County Courthouse is a historic courthouse located at Burnsville, Yancey County, North Carolina.  It was built in 1908, and is a two-story, Classical Revival style, stuccoed concrete block building faced in stucco. It has a central pedimented entrance pavilion surmounted by a blocky cupola.  It features Corinthian order pilasters and polygonal corner projections. The building housed county offices until 1965, when a new courthouse was constructed.

It was listed on the National Register of Historic Places in 1979.

References

County courthouses in North Carolina
Courthouses on the National Register of Historic Places in North Carolina
Neoclassical architecture in North Carolina
Government buildings completed in 1908
Buildings and structures in Yancey County, North Carolina
National Register of Historic Places in Yancey County, North Carolina
1908 establishments in North Carolina